Martino's mole (Talpa martinorum) is a species of small blind mole in the family Talpidae found in eastern Thrace along the western Black Sea coast in south-eastern Bulgaria and north-eastern Turkey, mainly in the Strandzha mountain range. In Bulgaria it is found in Strandzha Nature Park.

Taxonomy 
Individuals of this species were formerly classified as T. caeca or T. levantis until being classified as a new species. T. martinorum is not closely related to the other Talpa endemic to the Balkans, T. stankovici. Rather, it is most closely related to the widespread T. europaea as well as T. aquitania, and T. occidentalis, both of which are endemic to western Europe. Based on this, T. martinorum likely originated from an isolated population of a mole species that was also ancestral to T. europaea, as is also considered to be the case for the origin of T. aquitania and T. occidentalis. Fossil evidence shows that a mole species similar to the present T. martinorum lived in the region during the Pliocene, indicating that T. martinorum has persisted in its current territory for a long time.

References 

Talpa
Mammals described in 2018
Fauna of Bulgaria
Fauna of Turkey